Congregation B'nai Israel is a historic Conservative synagogue in Albuquerque, New Mexico. The building is notable for its distinctive Expressionist design by George Wynn, including an unusual undulating conical roof formed from polyurethane foam, as well as its importance in the city's Jewish community. The synagogue was completed in 1971 and was listed on the New Mexico State Register of Cultural Properties and the National Register of Historic Places in 2019.

History
Congregation B'nai Israel was established in 1920, meeting in various temporary locations until the first synagogue was completed in 1941 at Coal and Cedar. By the 1960s, the congregation needed more room to expand and purchased a new site at Indian School and Washington. Fundraising for the new building began in 1967 but was put on hold when the congregation decided to send most of the money to support Israel in the Six-Day War instead. The campaign was restarted in 1968, and ground was broken on the new building in December 1969.

The synagogue was formally dedicated in December 1971 and has remained in use since. The lobby was expanded and remodeled in 1990. In 2019, the building was added to the New Mexico State Register of Cultural Properties and the National Register of Historic Places.

Architecture
The synagogue was designed by local architect George Wynn and comprises a large circular sanctuary with an adjoining social hall and education wing at the rear. Wynn said he chose the design simply for its emotional impact, and that allusions to the Twelve Tribes of Israel and the desert tents of the Exodus were coincidental, though appropriate.

The space between the beams is filled in with brown brick curtain walls with a glass clerestory under the eaves. The interior of the sanctuary has about 500 seats and a ribbed ceiling of knotty spruce with a skylight at the apex. The rear wing is two stories in height with brown brick walls and a flat roof.

References

Synagogues in New Mexico
Buildings and structures in Albuquerque, New Mexico
New Mexico State Register of Cultural Properties
National Register of Historic Places in Albuquerque, New Mexico
Properties of religious function on the National Register of Historic Places in New Mexico
Synagogues completed in 1971
Modernist architecture in New Mexico